The DH 440 is a type of diesel-hydraulic locomotive built by Henschel in 1956–58 as one of their second-generation diesel locomotive types. They had wheel arrangement C, with three axles powered through a jackshaft.

Six units of the type were built, of which three were bought by the Danish State Railways (DSB) and designated Class MH, numbered 201–203. These formed the basis for the 120 locomotives MH 301–420, built by Danish company Frichs without licence from Henschel. The other three units were purchased by different German industrial railways.

References

External links 

 Henschel - DH 440 at rangierdiesel.de 
 DSB Litra MH at jernbanen.dk 

MH 201–203
DH 440
C locomotives
Railway locomotives introduced in 1956
Diesel locomotives of Denmark
Standard gauge locomotives of Denmark
Diesel-hydraulic locomotives of Germany
Standard gauge locomotives of Germany